The Homo Homini Award (Latin: "A human to another human") is given annually by the Czech human rights organization People in Need to "an individual in recognition of a dedication to the promotion of human rights, democracy and non-violent solutions to political conflicts". The award is presented at the One World Film Festival, the world's largest human rights film festival.

Winners of the Homo Homini Award
Past winners of the Homo Homini Award include the following:
1994: Sergei Kovalev
1997: Szeto Wah
1998: Ibrahim Rugova
1999: Oswaldo Payá Sardiñas
2000: Min Ko Naing
2001: Zackie Achmat
2002: Thích Huyền Quang, Thích Quảng Độ and Thadeus Nguyễn Văn Lý
2003: Nataša Kandić
2004: Gheorghe Briceag
2005: Ales Bialatski and the Belarusian organisation Viasna
2006: Svetlana Gannushkina
2007: Su Su Nway, Phyu Phyu Thin, and Nilar Thein
2008: Liu Xiaobo, and symbolically to all of the signatories of Charter 08
2009: Majid Tavakoli and Abdollah Momeni
2010: Azimzhan Askarov
2011: Doctors Coordinate of Damascus
2012: Intiqam Aliyev
2013: Sapijat Magomedova 
2014: Souad Nawfal
2015: eleven dissidents from the formerly imprisoned 75 Cuban dissidents, who refused to leave the country to fight for democracy
2016: Committee for the Prevention of Torture (Russia)
2017: Phạm Đoan Trang
2018: Francisca Ramírez
2019: Buzurgmehr Yorov
2020: Marfa Rabkova, Andrei Chapiuk, Leanid Sudalenka, Tatsiana Lasitsa of the Viasna Human Rights Centre
2021: Mahienour El-Massry

References

External links
Homo Homini award site

Awards established in 1994
Human rights awards
1994 establishments in the Czech Republic